Pablo Parés (August 28, 1978, in Haedo, Buenos Aires Province) is an Argentine film director, producer, actor, cinematographer, screenwriter and film editor best known for his work in the horror film genre.

He has directed and produced over 20 films. He is especially noted for directing the Plaga Zombie comedy horror film series—Plaga Zombie (1997), Plaga Zombie: Zona Mutante (2001), and Plaga Zombie: Revolución Tóxica (2012)—which he also produced, starred in and wrote.

Selected filmography

External links
 

1978 births
Living people
People from Morón Partido
Argentine male film actors
Argentine film producers
Argentine film directors
Argentine film editors
Argentine screenwriters
Male screenwriters
Argentine male writers
Argentine cinematographers